The 1976 Miami Redskins football team was an American football team that represented Miami University in the Mid-American Conference (MAC) during the 1976 NCAA Division I football season. In their third season under head coach Dick Crum, Miami finished in seventh place in the MAC with a 3–8 record (2–4 against MAC opponents) and were outscored by all opponents by a combined total of 208 to 160.

The team's statistical leaders included Larry Fortner with 1,219 passing yards and 1,002 rushing yards, Rob Carpenter with 1,064 rushing yards, and Steve Joecken with 404 receiving yards.

Schedule

References

Miami
Miami RedHawks football seasons
Miami Redskins football